Caladenia exilis is a species of flowering plant in the orchid family Orchidaceae and is endemic to the south-west of Western Australia. It is a ground orchid with a single erect, linear leaf and up to three white to greenish-cream or dark pinkish-maroon flowers.

Description

Taxonomy and naming
Caladenia exilis was first formally described in 2001 by Stephen Hopper and Andrew Phillip Brown in the journal Nuytsia from specimens collected near Nyabing by Robert Bates in 1990. The specific epithet (exilis) means "slender", "alluding to the slender labellum, petals and sepals".

In the same journal Hopper and Andrew Brown described two subspecies of C. exilis, and the names are accepted by the Australian Plant Census:
 Caladenia exilis Hopper & A.P.Br. subsp. exilis - salt lake spider orchid, has white to greenish-cream flowers with pale maroon markings.
 Caladenia exilis subsp. vanleeuwenii M.A.Clem. & Hopper - Moora spider orchid, has dark pinkish-maroon to cream-coloured or variegated flowers with prominent maroon markings.

Distribution and habitat
Subspecies exilis grows near salt lakes between Mullewa and Woodanilling in the Avon Wheatbelt, Jarrah Forest and Mallee bioregions. Subspecies vanleeuwenii grows in winter-wet depressions in salmon gum and york gum woodland, or on granite outcrops, north and south of Moora in the Avon Wheatbelt and Jarrah Forest bioregions of south-western Western Australia.

References

exilis
Plants described in 2001
Orchids of Western Australia
Taxa named by Stephen Hopper
Taxa named by Andrew Phillip Brown